Michael John Giles (born 6 November 1940) is an Irish former association football player and manager best remembered for his time as a midfielder with Leeds United in the 1960s and 1970s. After retiring from management in 1985, Giles served as the senior analyst on RTÉ Sport's coverage of association football from 1986 until 2016. The FAI voted Giles as the greatest Irish player of the last 50 years at the UEFA Jubilee Awards in 2004.

After winning an FA Cup winner's medal under Matt Busby at Manchester United, Giles moved to Leeds in 1963 where he played in midfield alongside captain Billy Bremner. The duo formed a central midfield partnership which was one of the best in English and European club football. Their pairing helped yield several major trophies in the most successful era in Leeds' history. Giles and Bremner both scored 115 goals for the club.

In his later years in football, Giles pursued a managerial career which saw him installed as player-manager and manager of, among others, West Bromwich Albion, the Republic of Ireland, Vancouver Whitecaps and Shamrock Rovers. Despite having an outstanding knowledge of the game, Giles personally never liked being a manager. He became disillusioned with aspects of the job, such as suffering at the hands of non-committal boardrooms, and left management permanently in 1985. He later declared that he had no regrets about quitting managerial life.

Subsequently, after repeated encouragement from childhood friend Eamon Dunphy, Giles would inadvertently enter the world of football punditry in 1986. He went on to establish himself as a senior analyst on RTÉ Sport until 2016. In December 2019, he was employed as an analyst for Premier Sports' live coverage of the English Premier League matches. Also, he writes two columns per week for the Irish Evening Herald newspaper, and offers his opinions about the game on radio station Newstalk 106.

Club career
Giles grew up in Ormond Square, a working class area of inner-city Dublin, where he developed much of the skills that would aid him in becoming a professional footballer. He was encouraged to enter the game through his father Christy who played for Bohemians in the 1920s and managed Drumcondra during the 1940s.

Growing up, Giles remarked "I didn't consider myself Irish".

Giles was spotted in Dublin playing for Stella Maris, before he began his English career with Manchester United. He joined Matt Busby's team for a £10 signing-on fee in 1956. He was given an early first-team debut in 1959 after eight of the team died in the Munich air disaster in February of the previous year. Among the dead was Bill Whelan, who was five years older than Giles and also came from the Cabra district of Dublin.

He was also chosen to play for the Republic of Ireland team by the age of 18.

Giles was a regular first team player over the next four years, playing alongside Bobby Charlton and Denis Law. Manchester United won the FA Cup in 1963, where Giles played the defence-splitting pass which started the move towards a winning goal by David Herd.

After being out of favour, he asked for a transfer and joined Leeds United for £33,000. "I am going to haunt him", is what Giles said of Busby, to his wife Anne, after the Scotsman had forced his departure when freezing him out of the starting team.

Giles would soon evolve into one of the finest central midfielders in England, as Leeds won the Second Division title in his first season there. In 1965, he was in the team which came close to a League championship and FA Cup "double" but missed out on both, to Manchester United and to Liverpool respectively.

Giles formed a strong partnership with Billy Bremner as Leeds manager Don Revie built a new team around them. The players had similarities in their styles and were a tremendous foil for one another. Giles was known as the creative force and Bremner as the ball-winner, but each was capable of doing the other's primary job.

In the 1967–68 season Leeds won both the League Cup and the Fairs Cup. That was the first season in which Giles was affected by injury, which meant he missed the second leg of the Fairs Cup final. In the 1968–69 season, Giles was instrumental in Leeds becoming league champions in a then record 67 points from 42 matches at 2 points for a win, a record that stood for ten seasons. In 1970, Giles again had a magnificent season as Leeds chased three trophies but lost all three, the League went to Everton; the FA Cup to Chelsea after a replay; and the European Cup campaign ended at the hands of Celtic in the semi-finals.

In the fifth round of the 1971 FA Cup, when Leeds were unexpectedly beaten 3–2 by Colchester United, Giles scored Leeds' second goal as they almost came back from 3–0 down. Leeds regained the Fairs Cup but lost the League title on the last day, with Arsenal getting the victory they needed to earn the championship and form one half of a successful "double" bid.

Leeds won their first FA Cup and Giles his second when they defeated Arsenal 1–0 at Wembley in 1972, yet again they missed out on the League on the final day of the season after defeat to Wolverhampton Wanderers. Sunderland and A.C. Milan beat Leeds in the finals of the FA Cup and the European Cup Winners Cup in 1973, rendering Leeds trophyless again. Jack Charlton's retirement in 1973 also left Giles as the most senior member of the squad. In the same year he started to combine his Leeds duties with a spell as player-manager of his country.

In 1974, a 29-match unbeaten run at the start of the season helped Leeds coast to their second title, but then controversy reigned after Revie quit to take over the England team. Revie recommended to the Leeds board of directors that Giles, nearly 34 and approaching the end of his playing career, should be his successor. The board instead appointed Brian Clough, a brilliant manager but a controversial choice as he had been publicly critical of Leeds in the past and was not an admirer of Revie. Clough and the players never got on – the players had wanted Giles too – and the board reacted by dismissing Clough with a big pay-off after just 44 days in charge. Giles still did not get the job though (that went to Jimmy Armfield) and concentrated on playing as Leeds chased a place in their first European Cup final. Giles himself never applied for the Leeds vacancy on those two occasions, his name had instead been put forward as a candidate by others. Also in 1974, Giles was nominated—along with Danny Blanchflower—by Bill Nicholson as his successor at Tottenham Hotspur. The Spurs board appointed Terry Neill instead.

Giles was outstanding in Leeds' European campaign but was no longer an automatic fixture in the side. After appearing in the 1975 final, which Leeds lost 2–0 to Bayern Munich, Giles accepted an offer in June 1975 from West Bromwich Albion to become their player-manager, while still playing for and managing the Irish team.

Status within the game
Giles is widely regarded as one of the greatest footballers to have come out of the Republic of Ireland. High tributes have been conferred on Giles by hugely successful former managers such as Alf Ramsey, Matt Busby and Brian Clough. His status at Leeds United was noted when supporters there named him in the greatest Leeds XI of all time. His place in English football history was recognised in 1998 when the Football League, as part of its centenary celebrations, listed Giles on its list of 100 League legends. When Giles was quizzed as to the differences between himself and another highly regarded former Irish player, Roy Keane, he said: "If forced to compare us, I'd say I was slightly more creative than him and he [Keane] was a better ball-winner."

Reputation as a hard player
In the early part of his career Giles endured some rough treatment. This occurred when he suffered a career-threatening ankle injury at the hands of Birmingham City's Johnny Watts, and knee ligament damage sustained when tackled by Eddie McCreadie at Stamford Bridge. Being a creative and diminutive figure, Giles thereafter accepted he would have to become a tougher player in order to avoid being singled out by opponents. On later becoming a pundit, Giles at length wrote about how he felt he had to become "a lion rather than a lamb" on the pitch so as to help achieve his full potential. His primary reason for this was to avoid being labelled a hypocrite when the time came for him to give judgement on tough tackling by others.

Player-manager career
Giles showed much promise as a young player-manager of the Republic of Ireland, as he combined his duties in charge of West Brom, where after a slow start, he won the majority of Baggies supporters over. Under his leadership, they were promoted from the Second Division in April 1976, and finished 7th in the First Division in 1976–77. He recently said the time he spent at West Brom was amongst the happiest of his career despite him not winning trophies there. However his spell at the club also witnessed several clashes with the club's board over the financial running of the club, an area that Giles felt the board excluded him from too much. Giles even tendered his resignation over the matter on the day promotion was secured, although he was persuaded to change his mind and oversee the First Division campaign. He resigned as player-manager at West Brom on 21 April 1977, the very same day as his former team-mate Jack Charlton resigned his managerial post at Middlesbrough, and moved back to Ireland to manage Shamrock Rovers until 1983.

He returned to the Hawthorns for a second spell as manager during the 1983–84 season, steering the side to safety despite losing his first game in charge 1–0 to Third Division Plymouth Argyle in the FA Cup. The following season saw Albion start well and they were as high as 5th at Christmas, but finished 12th. However Giles' decision to sell fan favourite Cyrille Regis and top scorer Garry Thompson led to supporter disgruntlement, with the replacements Giles signed - Garth Crooks and Imre Varadi - proving unsuccessful. He resigned as manager in October 1985 following a 3–0 defeat at Coventry City, a record ninth consecutive defeat for Albion. Youth team manager Nobby Stiles, who was also Giles' brother-in-law, replaced him although, despite slight improvement in results, the club could not climb off the foot of the table and, under Ron Saunders, finished in bottom place.

Managing career

Republic of Ireland
As player-manager of the Republic of Ireland between 1973 and 1980, Giles oversaw a revival in the fortunes of the national side which had struggled for the previous decade. The 1976 European Championship qualifiers saw the international debut of Liam Brady and a more respectable showing. In the 1978 FIFA World Cup qualifiers, the side finished only two points short of qualification, defeating France at home during that campaign.

Shamrock Rovers
During his five and a half-year spell in charge at Glenmalure Park Rovers won the FAI Cup in 1978, he scored 2 goals in 4 appearances in the European Cup Winners Cup and captained Ireland nine times, scoring once. Giles played his last game on 14 December 1980 at Milltown, he was 40 years of age.

He resigned at Milltown on 3 February 1983, after having left his Ireland job in March 1980, and ventured across the Atlantic for spells in charge of clubs in the North American Soccer League . In 1981, he was hired to coach the Vancouver Whitecaps of the NASL. He held that position for three seasons, being named the 1982 North American Soccer League Coach of the Year.

Media career

Giles later returned to Ireland and settled into a much-admired career in journalism and started out as a pundit on Raidió Teilifís Éireann (RTÉ) in November 1986. He featured on Premier Soccer Saturday and its international and European soccer coverage, particularly their coverage of games involving the Republic of Ireland national football team. Giles contributed to RTÉ Sport's coverage of the 2010 World Cup where prior to it starting he correctly predicted Spain would win the tournament. He is currently the leading soccer analyst on Newstalk.

Of the English Premier League, Giles is often critical of the methods of modern coaching, and in particular, younger managers, saying in 2016:

When you hear the younger managers talking, it's all about tactics now. If their players are not playing well, they change the formation. There's nothing about not passing the ball to each other or misplacing passes. It's all about, well the tactics were wrong. I've seen it so often, you hear it on the television as well. Their team is playing very poorly, they're 2–0 down at half-time, they're giving the ball away, kicking it out of play. Well what do you have to do, and they start talking about changing the formation. No matter what formation you play you have to pass the ball to each other.

He was also part of RTÉ Sport's studio coverage of the 2014 FIFA World Cup.

Giles left RTÉ Sport after UEFA Euro 2016 after 30 years with the broadcaster, his last appearance was on the night of the Euro 2016 final.

Retirement
Giles resides in the Harborne area of the city of Birmingham in England. He has played golf for many years, and at one time, played off a handicap of five, but with his advancing age his handicap has risen to 12, "a bad 12" he claims. To coincide with his 70th birthday, Giles compiled a first ever autobiography chronicling his life in and outside of football which was released in November 2010. In 2010, his autobiography, titled A Football Man, became the best selling book in the Republic of Ireland. In it, he claims to be an admirer of cricket where he attended the occasional game in his spare time as a footballer.

Media portrayals and successful legal action
Giles was portrayed by actor Peter McDonald in the 2009 film The Damned United, which centred on Brian Clough's ill-fated 44-day spell as Leeds United manager in 1974. Giles successfully sued the author of the book, David Peace, who printed the work in 2006, from which the film was made. He said of Peace: "His book was outrageous. I'm portrayed as the scheming leprechaun. He [Peace] had me in conversations with Clough that never happened. It made Clough out to be a wild man whereas he wasn't drinking then. I didn't get on with him but I found him highly intelligent. Peace said the novel was fiction based on fact, trouble is, people assume it's the official version. The movie was a misinterpretation of the misinterpretation that was the book!"

In another interview in relation to his taking court action, Giles said: "I took my stand because I was the only one alive who could do anything about it. The Clough family had no comeback. They couldn't do anything as Brian was dead, that was a huge influence (on taking the legal action)."

As part of the settlement in the 2008 High Court dispute, the publisher of the book, Faber and Faber, were ordered to remove from any future editions the references perceived by Giles as damaging and untrue.

Family
In 1966, Giles married Anne, sister of Irish Olympic sprinter Paul Dolan, with whom he had four sons and two daughters. Two of his sons, Michael and Chris, played for Shamrock Rovers; Michael from 1981 to 1983 and Chris from 1993 to 1995. Giles' father, Christy Giles, played for Bohemians in the 1920s and won a league title in his first season at Dalymount Park. His uncle Chris Giles (Irish footballer) also played for Ireland. Giles is a brother-in-law of Nobby Stiles, his former Manchester United team-mate, who married into the Giles family. His uncle Matt managed Transport to FAI Cup success in 1950.

John Giles Foundation
In 2008, the Football Association of Ireland founded a non-profit trust to fund grassroots clubs and football at youth level. Giles, who had previously hosted charity golf events to raise money for good causes, allowed the FAI the right to use his image for the charitable organisation, thus giving rise to the John Giles Foundation. This would involve grassroots clubs taking part in sponsored walks called the "Walk of Dreams", whereby half the money raised by each club would go to the club themselves, and the other half going to clubs selected by the foundation.

The inaugural event in 2011 was met with negative criticism, as the main walk ending at the Aviva Stadium was marred by inadequate toilet facilities at the stadium endpoint, along with expensively-priced food, a lack of bottled water and the absence of Republic of Ireland senior international footballers, whose attendance at the event had been promised, all of which went on to be discussed on RTÉ Radio 1's Liveline programme.

While the John Giles Foundation raised some €700,000 for its causes during its lifetime, it emerged in 2019 that the FAI, under the stewardship of John Delaney had paid over €500,000 to former footballer Con Martin jnr, for the concept of the foundation, the fundraising walks and a kit-purchasing idea, payments of which were unknown to Giles at the time.

In September 2022, the FAI announced the winding down of the John Giles Foundation, with a final donation of €55,000 being made to the FAI's Football For All schools programme.

Career statistics

Club

International

Managerial
Source:

Honours
Manchester United
FA Cup: 1962–63

Leeds United
Football League First Division: 1968–69, 1973–74
Second Division: 1963–64
FA Cup: 1971–72
League Cup: 1967–68
FA Charity Shield: 1969
Inter-Cities Fairs Cup: 1968, 1971
European Cup runner-up: 1975

Shamrock Rovers
FAI Cup: 1978
Tyler Cup: 1978–79

Individual
100 League Legends: 1998
UEFA Jubilee Award – Republic of Ireland's Golden Player: 2004
English Football Hall of Fame: 2010 Inductee
Trinity College Dublin honorary doctorate: 2013
FAI Hall of Fame: Inducted 2020

References
General
 

Specific

External links

John Giles Foundation

1940 births
Living people
Association footballers from Dublin (city)
Republic of Ireland association footballers
Republic of Ireland international footballers
Stella Maris F.C. players
Republic of Ireland expatriate association footballers
Expatriate footballers in England
Manchester United F.C. players
Leeds United F.C. players
West Bromwich Albion F.C. players
Expatriate soccer players in the United States
Irish expatriate sportspeople in the United States
Philadelphia Fury (1978–1980) players
Shamrock Rovers F.C. players
Shamrock Rovers F.C. guest players
English Football League players
North American Soccer League (1968–1984) players
League of Ireland players
League of Ireland XI players
Republic of Ireland football managers
Republic of Ireland national football team managers
West Bromwich Albion F.C. managers
Shamrock Rovers F.C. managers
Vancouver Whitecaps (1974–1984) coaches
English Football League managers
League of Ireland managers
North American Soccer League (1968–1984) coaches
English Football Hall of Fame inductees
UEFA Golden Players
Television personalities from Dublin (city)
Irish association football commentators
The Herald (Ireland) people
Association football midfielders
Association football player-managers
People from Cabra, Dublin
FA Cup Final players